Jimmy Lloyd (November 3, 1918 – August 25, 1988) was an American actor who played Tex in the 1947 film serial The Sea Hound.

Partial filmography

Blondie (1938)
When Johnny Comes Marching Home (1942) - Sailor (uncredited)
She's a Sweetheart (1944) - Pete Ryan
Together Again (1944) - Master of Ceremonies (uncredited)
Let's Go Steady (1945) - Henry McCoy
Ten Cents a Dance (1945) - Billy Sparks
The Story of G.I. Joe (1945) - Private Spencer
I Love a Bandleader (1945) - Assistant Band Leader (uncredited)
Snafu (1945) - Danny Baker
The Bandit of Sherwood Forest (1946) - Crossbowman (uncredited)
The Gentleman Misbehaves (1946) - Jimmy Drake
Talk About a Lady (1946) - Reporter (uncredited)
Night Editor (1946) - Clerk (uncredited)
Gallant Journey (1946) - Dan Mahoney / Prof. LaSalle
It's Great to Be Young (1946) - Ricky Malone
The Jolson Story (1946) - Roy Anderson (uncredited)
Cigarette Girl (1947) - Joe Atkins
The Sea Hound (1947, Serial) - Tex
Key Witness (1947) - Larry Summers
Two Blondes and a Redhead (1947) - Tommy Randell
Glamour Girl (1948) - Buddy Butterfield
My Dog Rusty (1948) - Rodney Pyle
The Fuller Brush Man (1948) - Williams (uncredited)
Walk a Crooked Mile (1948) - FBI Agent Alison (uncredited)
The Return of October (1948) - Man at Racetrack (uncredited)
The Dark Past (1948) - Herb Fuller (uncredited)
Slightly French (1949) - Assistant (uncredited)
Shockproof (1949) - Clerk (uncredited)
Riders of the Whistling Pines (1949) - Forester Joe
Manhattan Angel (1949) - Elmer
Miss Grant Takes Richmond (1949) - Homer White (uncredited)
Mary Ryan, Detective (1949) - Detective Gordon (uncredited)
Hokus Pokus (1949, a Three Stooges film)
Blondie's Hero (1950) - Cpl. Bill Touhey (uncredited)
Beauty on Parade (1950) - Johnny Fennell
David Harding, Counterspy (1950) - Burton (uncredited)
When You're Smiling (1950) - Dave
Counterspy Meets Scotland Yard (1950) - Agent Burton
Gasoline Alley (1951) - Harry Dorsey
Lullaby of Broadway (1951) - Reporter (uncredited)
Fighting Coast Guard (1951) - Upper Classman (uncredited)
G.I. Jane (1951) - Lt. B.B. Bradford
Joe Palooka in Triple Cross (1951) - Bill, Reporter
All That I Have (1951) - Reporter Noonan
Venture of Faith (1951)
The Beast from 20,000 Fathoms (1953) - Soldier (uncredited)
Calamity Jane (1953) - Officer at Fort Dance (uncredited)
The Battle of Rogue River (1954) - Pvt. Hanley (uncredited)
A Touch of Larceny (1960)
The Love-Ins (1967) - Mr. Henning
Who's Minding the Mint? (1967) - Garbage Man (uncredited) (final film role)

References

1918 births
1988 deaths
20th-century American male actors